Kenzie Weir  (born 14 January 2004) is a Scottish football defender who plays for Lewes on loan from Everton in the English Women's Super League and the Scotland U-19 national team.

Career
Weir made her debut for Everton on 30 January 2022 against Huddersfield Town in the FA Cup.

In August 2022, she signed her first professional contract in a three-year deal with Everton.

In February 2023, Weir joined FA Women's Championship club Lewes on loan until the end of the season.

Personal life
Weir is the daughter of former Scottish footballer David Weir.

References

Living people
2004 births
Scottish women's footballers
Everton F.C. players
Women's Super League players
Women's association football defenders
Lewes F.C. Women players